A bust of Tomáš Garrigue Masaryk by Josef Mařatka is installed in San Francisco's Golden Gate Park, in the state of California.

External links
 

Busts in California
Golden Gate Park
Monuments and memorials in California
Outdoor sculptures in San Francisco
Sculptures of men in California